Coco Rico is a Puerto Rican soda brand from Coco Rico, Inc. It is flavored with coconut extract, and is produced in both plastic (polyethylene terephthalate or PET) bottles and aluminum cans. Coco Rico comes in various flavors.

The Coco Rico brand was introduced into supermarkets in Puerto Rico in 1935, and is currently available throughout the United States. The brand is family owned.

Throughout its history, the brand has used the color green prominently on its cans and bottles. The introduction of its Diet version, Diet Coco Rico, saw the green and white pattern on their cans reversed: the Diet version uses white more prominently, with green lettering.

The beverage can also be used as an ingredient in cooking. One Vietnamese recipe adapted by an American cook uses Coco Rico to break down the protein in catfish.

See also
Coco Lopez

References

External links 
 Coco Rico Inc.

American soft drink brands
Companies of Puerto Rico
Drink companies of the United States